Dhooska or Dhuska is a popular deep-fried snack eaten all over Jharkhand, India. The dish is one of the delicacy of Jharkhandi cuisine. The main ingredients in this savoury fried bread dish are powdered rice, powdered chana dal and sometimes boiled potatoes. The bread is then deep fried. It is often served with any sauce or chutney. Dhooska is mostly made in market-area stalls where people enjoy it as a snack and is rarely found in larger restaurants.

See also 

 Chhilka Roti
 Pitha

References

Indian snack foods
Fried foods